Whitney Houston: I Wanna Dance with Somebody is a 2022 American biographical musical drama film directed by Kasi Lemmons, from a screenplay by Anthony McCarten, based on the life and career of American singer and actress Whitney Houston. The film stars Naomi Ackie as Houston with Stanley Tucci, Ashton Sanders, Tamara Tunie, Nafessa Williams, and Clarke Peters in supporting roles.

An authorized biopic on Houston's life was announced in early 2020, with Ackie cast in the lead role that December, and the rest of the cast signing on later the next year. Produced on a $45 million budget, filming took place in Massachusetts and New Jersey from August to December 2021.

Whitney Houston: I Wanna Dance with Somebody was released in the United States on December 23, 2022, by Sony Pictures Releasing. The film received mixed reviews from critics, who praised the performances of Ackie and Tucci as well as the music sequences, but criticized the screenplay.

Plot 
In 1983, 19-year-old Whitney Houston is being coached by her mother Cissy while leading a church choir in New Jersey. A professional singer herself, Cissy pushes her daughter to be better, though being hard on her at times. Whitney finds solace in a friendship with Robyn Crawford, which turns romantic, and they later move into their own apartment, much to the chagrin of Cissy. One night, Cissy and Whitney are set to perform at the Sweetwaters nightclub. After spotting producer Clive Davis in the audience, Cissy feigns sickness and encourages Whitney to open the show. Whitney performs "The Greatest Love of All", which impresses Davis, who signs Whitney to Arista Records.

He books her for her first major live performance on The Merv Griffin Show, where she gives a performance of "Home". Soon afterwards, Whitney releases a highly successful debut album, and sets up her production company, Nippy Inc., run by her overbearing father and self-appointed manager, John. When Whitney wants to hire Crawford as a personal assistant, John refuses due to their personal relationship and tells the pair to date men, to Robyn's dismay.

After recording a love song with Jermaine Jackson, the two start a sexual relationship, which angers Robyn. After a fight, Robyn breaks down and Whitney ends their romantic relationship, but remain close friends. In 1987, Whitney releases her sophomore album and its leading single, "I Wanna Dance with Somebody (Who Loves Me)", which makes her a crossover success. However, she is accused by a radio show interviewer of selling out and not sounding "black enough", to which Whitney angrily defends herself. 

Attending the Soul Train Music Awards in 1988, Whitney is met with protesters at the red carpet and her name is booed after singer Anita Baker announces her as one of the nominees for Best Music Video. Whitney meets singer Bobby Brown and the two start to date; eventually, Bobby proposes to her in their limousine, and she accepts. Shortly afterward, Bobby informs her that he impregnated his ex-girlfriend, leading an enraged Whitney to storm out of the limousine, but they quickly reconcile. 

In the early 1990s Whitney is at her peak, performing the "Star Spangled Banner" at Super Bowl XXV and acting in the film The Bodyguard, and going on tour, performing "I Will Always Love You" at a stadium in South Africa for newly inaugurated president Nelson Mandela. Following a miscarriage, she later marries Bobby and has a daughter, Bobbi Kristina Brown. One right, Whitney returns home to find Bobby gone and her credit card missing. When he returns the following morning, the two argue, resulting in her throwing him out of the house and using drugs to cope. 

In 1998, Clive meets with Whitney to discuss her not releasing a new studio album in over eight years, despite releasing seven major singles and starring in three films. Inspired by her tumultuous relationship with Brown, Whitney records the ballad "Why Does It Hurt So Bad", despite rejecting it several times before. Later, she confronts her father about spending too much of her money on expensive gifts and then discovers that John has been negotiating a new $100 million contract with Arista behind her back.

Later, dealing with insomnia, Whitney goes to Clive's hotel room and asks him to show her potential songs. Upon finding one she likes, a new studio album is released. The following tour is exhausting, and leads to Houston having a mental and physical decline in which she descends to drug addiction, damaging her voice and reputation. Davis urges her to enter rehab, but she refuses.

Near the tour's end, Robyn and Bobby argue, after the former attempts to get Whitney to return home and end the tour. In the end, she chooses to continue the tour, leading to Robyn leaving Whitney's life. Before leaving, she later tells her that her father is dying in a hospital. There, Whitney is confronted with a $100 million lawsuit from John's company. She cuts ties with her father, even refusing to attend his funeral. Cissy finds her daughter in a drug-induced haze and orders her to rehab by a police order. Eventually, Whitney sobers up, reconnects with daughter Krissy, and divorces Brown.

In 2009, Houston attempts a comeback with a new album and performs one of its tracks on The Oprah Winfrey Show. Following the performance, Clive visits Whitney and she tells him that she is interested in going back on tour, but Clive advises her to rest. But she goes on with the tour, which proves disastrous and prompts walkouts due to her performance. In February 2012, Houston arrives at the Beverly Hilton in Los Angeles to perform "Home" at a pre-Grammy party. Her bassist Rickey advises her to call it off and rest, but she refuses. At the hotel's bar, she and the bartender reminisce.

In her hotel room, a tearful Whitney begins running bath water and sings "Home" to herself while reminiscing about her life and career before dying suddenly. In a flashback, Houston sings a medley of "I Loves You, Porgy", "And I Am Telling You I'm Not Going", and "I Have Nothing", which is met with a standing ovation.

Cast 
 Naomi Ackie as Whitney Houston
 Stanley Tucci as Clive Davis, Whitney's record producer and supportive friend
 Ashton Sanders as Bobby Brown, Whitney's husband
 Tamara Tunie as Cissy Houston, Whitney's mother
 Nafessa Williams as Robyn Crawford, Whitney's best friend, assistant, Williams also previously played another character in a 2015 television film about Whitney Houston.
 Clarke Peters as John Houston, Whitney's strict father
 Dave Heard as Rickey Minor, Whitney's musical director
 Bria Danielle Singleton as Bobbi Kristina Brown, Whitney and Bobby's teenage daughter
 Bailee Lopes as young Bobbi Kristina Brown
 Kris Sidberry as Patricia "Pat" Houston, Whitney's sister-in-law

Production 
On April 22, 2020, Stella Meghie was set to direct a Whitney Houston biopic, titled I Wanna Dance with Somebody, with Anthony McCarten attached to pen the screenplay and produce the film along with Clive Davis, Pat Houston, Larry Mestel, Denis O'Sullivan and Jeff Kalligheri. McCarten, who self-financed an option for Houston's life rights, wrote the script on spec, and lined up rights and music. On August 4, 2020, TriStar Pictures acquired the film. On September 1, 2021, Kasi Lemmons took over directing duties from Meghie who eventually served as an executive producer.

On December 15, 2020, Naomi Ackie was set to portray Houston. In September 2021, Ashton Sanders was cast as Bobby Brown, Houston's husband of fifteen years. The same month, Stanley Tucci was cast as Clive Davis. In October 2021, Clarke Peters and Tamara Tunie were cast in the film, and Nafessa Williams was cast as Robyn Crawford, replacing Moses Ingram.

The film was expected to begin principal photography on August 9, 2021, in Newark, New Jersey and Boston, Massachusetts, according to one source. In August 2021, Compelling Pictures was in pre-production on the film at Marina Studios in Boston. In October and November, scenes were shot in Arlington, Massachusetts, as well as at Worcester Regional Airport, Wang Theater, Cutler Majestic Theatre and Gillette Stadium.

Soundtrack 

The soundtrack was released by RCA Records on December 16, 2022. It includes two hours of remixed and original versions of Houston's songs, with guest features by BeBe Winans, Clean Bandit, Kygo, Lucky Daye, SG Lewis, Samaria, Jax Jones, Leikeli47, P2J, Oxlade, and Pheelz.

Release 
The film had its world premiere at the AMC Lincoln Square in New York City in December 13, 2022, and was released theatrically on December 23, 2022 by Sony Pictures Releasing.

The film was released for VOD on February 7, 2023, followed by a Blu-ray and DVD release on February 28, 2023.

Reception

Box office
, Whitney Houston: I Wanna Dance With Somebody has grossed $23.7 million in the United States and Canada, and $35.7 million in other territories, for a worldwide total of $59.3 million.

In the United States and Canada, I Wanna Dance With Somebody was released alongside Babylon, and was initially projected to gross $12–15 million from 3,625 theaters over its four-day opening weekend. The film made $2 million on its first day, including $750,000 from Thursday night previews. It went on to debut to $5.3 million in its opening weekend (and a total of $7.5 million over the four days), finishing third behind Avatar: The Way of Water and Puss in Boots: The Last Wish. Deadline cited the threat of a tripledemic surge in COVID-19 and flu cases and the nationwide impact of Winter Storm Elliott as reasons for lower-than-expected theater attendance. The film held well in its second weekend, dropping just 16 percent to $3.9 million, finishing in fourth.

In the United Kingdom, Whitney Houston: I Wanna Dance with Somebody debuted in second place, behind Avatar: The Way of Water. The film grossed £3.3 million ($3.9 million) in its opening weekend. It held its place of second the following week, grossing £1.3 million for a total of £6.2 million ($7.5 million).

Critical response
  Audiences polled by CinemaScore gave the film an average grade of "A" on an A+ to F scale, while PostTrak reported 88% of audience members gave the film a positive score, with 68% saying they would definitely recommend it.

Accolades
The film was nominated for Outstanding Supporting Visual Effects in a Photoreal Feature at the 21st Visual Effects Society Awards.

Naomi Ackie was nominated for the EE Rising Star award for I Wanna Dance with Somebody at the 76th British Academy Film Awards.

The film was nominated for Outstanding Achievement in Music Editing – Feature Motion Picture at the 70th Motion Picture Sound Editors’ Golden Reel Awards.

Kasi Lemmons was nominated for Outstanding Directing in a Motion Picture for I Wanna Dance with Somebody at the 54th NAACP Image Awards.

References

External links 
 
 
 

2022 films
2022 biographical drama films
2022 LGBT-related films
2020s American films
2020s English-language films
2020s historical films
2020s musical drama films
2020s biographical films
American biographical drama films
American historical films
African-American films
African-American biographical dramas
American LGBT-related films
American musical drama films
Biographical films about musicians
Biographical films about singers
Cultural depictions of American women
Cultural depictions of pop musicians
Cultural depictions of soul musicians
American films based on actual events
LGBT-related films based on actual events
LGBT-related biographical films
Drama films based on actual events
Films directed by Kasi Lemmons
Films impacted by the COVID-19 pandemic
Films set in 1983
Films set in 1985
Films set in 1987
Films set in 1989
Films set in 1992
Films set in 1994
Films set in 1998
Films set in 2000
Films set in 2006
Films set in 2009
Films set in 2012
Films set in the 1980s
Films set in the 1990s
Films set in the 2000s
Films set in the 2010s
Films set in New Jersey
Films with screenplays by Anthony McCarten
TriStar Pictures films
Whitney Houston
Films shot in Massachusetts
TSG Entertainment films